The Mysterious Cities of Gold is an animated series. It is the sequel to the 1982 TV series of the same name. The fourth season (counting from the 1982 series) premiered on RTS Un in Switzerland.

Characters

The main cast of the series includes:
 Esteban (voiced by Audrey Pic) – An orphan who was rescued at sea as a baby twelve years ago by the Spanish navigator Mendoza. He wears one of the two sun medallions. He dreams of adventure and is extremely impulsive. Esteban has a fear of heights which is confounded by the people of Barcelona who believe him to be the "Child of the Sun" and hoist him up high at the port to call out the sun to aid the departing ships. He joins the Spaniards in their search for one of The Seven Cities of Gold in the New World, hoping to find his father.
 Zia (voiced by Adeline Chetail) – The daughter of an Inca high priest. She was kidnapped from Peru five years ago, when she was seven, by the Spanish invaders and given as a present to the Queen of Spain for her daughter, Princess Margarita. She met Esteban when she was kidnapped by Mendoza for Governor Pizarro who wanted her to read the golden quipu. Zia wears a sun medallion like Esteban's, with an interlocking sun and moon disc.
 Tao (voiced by Caroline Mozzone) - The last living descendant of the sunken empire of Mu. He lived alone on the Galápagos Islands following the death of his father. Initially he is evasive of the others' company when they wash up on his island, but when the ship Solaris was revealed he joined them on their journey.
 Mendoza (voiced by Bruno Magne) – A Spaniard, navigator for the Spanish fleet. He rescued a young Esteban from a shipwreck during one of his voyages. An experienced sailor, a proficient navigator and a master swordsman, Mendoza places himself in the role of a leader. It is not always clear, however, where his loyalties lie and he is often at odds with the other characters. He is accompanied by two mercenaries: Sancho and Pedro. Mendoza has spent many years searching for information about the Mysterious Cities of Gold, which eventually led him to the sun medallions — one of which he took from Esteban when rescuing him for safe keeping.

Episodes

Season 2 

 Episodes 1 and 2 were shown on 9 November 2013 as a premiere double bill edition. They were repeated on 11 and 12 November at 6pm on Kix (UK and Ireland) before continuing on a daily basis every weekday until the end of the series.

Season 3

Season 4

Broadcast
The English version of the second season (counting from the 1982 series) premiered on Kix on November 9, 2013. Fabulous Films released it on DVD and Blu-ray on February 17, 2014 in the UK. In 2016, a third season was made and released in France, and subsequently released in English in Australia in 2018.

Reception
The show was well received by critics such as  Starburst and the Huffington Post.

Video game 
A video game called The Mysterious Cities of Gold: Secret Paths for Windows (available on Steam), Wii U, Nintendo 3DS and iOS based on the show was published by Ynnis Interactive.

References

External links

 
 Unofficial French The Mysterious Cities of Gold website , with details of all four seasons.

2012 French television series debuts
2013 French television series endings
2010s French animated television series
Television series about ancient astronauts
Atlantis in fiction
French children's animated adventure television series
Adventure anime and manga
Fantasy anime and manga
French children's animated fantasy television series
French drama television series
Historical anime and manga
Television shows based on children's books
Television shows based on American novels
Television series set in the 16th century
Television shows set in China
The Mysterious Cities of Gold